Louis-Arthur Giroux (6 April 1893 – 16 June 1945) was a Canadian politician.

Born in Farnham, Quebec, Giroux was appointed to the Legislative Council of Quebec for Wellington in 1937. A member of the Union nationale, he served until his death in 1945.

References

1893 births
1945 deaths
People from Montérégie
Union Nationale (Quebec) MLCs